Sheila Kennedy (born April 12, 1962) is an American model and actress who was the December 1981 Penthouse Pet of the Month and the 1983 Pet of the Year.

Career
Kennedy moved into the Penthouse Mansion in New York at the age of 18. She lived there for 10 years and after her appearances in Penthouse magazine as the December 1981 Pet of the Month and later as the 1983 Pet of the Year, Kennedy began an acting career. She appeared mostly in low-budget sex comedies, such as The First Turn-On!, Spring Break, and Ellie, starring alongside Academy Award winner Shelley Winters. Kennedy also was featured briefly in the opening scene of National Lampoon's European Vacation as a game show prize model  and appeared as a guest on Late Night With David Letterman.

In the spring of 2008, Kennedy was a houseguest on the U.S. reality show Big Brother 9. She came in 3rd Place and left the house on Day 77, after Ryan Quicksall won the final Head of Household competition and chose to evict her. Kennedy later cohosted House Calls: The Big Brother Talk Show for Big Brother 10 on Wednesdays.

Kennedy completed a memoir titled No One's Pet about her time living at the Penthouse Mansion and her relationship with publisher and magazine founder Bob Guccione. The book is published by Jerrick Media and was released in February 2016.

Personal life
Kennedy has a son. She is a former girlfriend of teen idol Leif Garrett and boxer Ray Mancini, as well as Scott Baio and appeared as herself in one episode of his reality television program Scott Baio is 45...and Single.

Look Away, a documentary about sexual abuse in the rock music industry features a story by Kennedy in which she recounts being victim of a violent sexual assault by an intoxicated Axl Rose of Guns 'N Roses in the late 1980's.

See also 
 List of Penthouse Pets of the Year
 Big Brother Season 9

References

External links
 
 
 
 Sheila Kennedy on MySpace

American female adult models
American film actresses
Big Brother (American TV series) contestants
Living people
Penthouse Pets of the Year
1962 births
People from Reseda, Los Angeles
21st-century American women